Escher Straße is one of a few elevated stations on the Cologne Stadtbahn network. It is served by line 13, also known as Gürtellinie (Belt Line). The halt is located on the Cologne Belt at Parkgürtel in the Cologne district of Nippes (Bilderstöckchen).

See also 
 List of Cologne KVB stations

External links 

 station info page 

Cologne KVB stations
Nippes, Cologne